Joseph Oscar Eaton (April 2, 1920 – September 28, 2008) was a United States district judge of the United States District Court for the Southern District of Florida.

Education and career

Born on April 2, 1920, in Monticello, Florida, Eaton received an Artium Baccalaureus degree in 1945 from Presbyterian College and a Bachelor of Laws in 1948 from the Fredric G. Levin College of Law at the University of Florida. He served as a Captain in the United States Army Air Forces from 1941 to 1945. He served as an assistant county solicitor in Dade County (now Miami-Dade County), Florida from 1949 to 1951. He served as a Major in the United States Air Force from 1951 to 1952. He was a Judge of the Eleventh Judicial Circuit Court of Florida serving Dade County from 1953 to 1954 and 1959 to 1967. He was in private practice in Miami, Florida from 1955 to 1959. He was a member of the Florida Senate from 1956 to 1959.

Federal judicial service

Eaton was nominated by President Lyndon B. Johnson on May 24, 1967, to a seat on the United States District Court for the Southern District of Florida vacated by Judge David W. Dyer. He was confirmed by the United States Senate on June 12, 1967, and received his commission on June 12, 1967. He served as Chief Judge from 1982 to 1984. He assumed senior status on April 2, 1985, where he also  sat by designation on the 11th Circuit Court of Appeals. His service terminated on September 28, 2008, due to his death in Miami.

References

Sources
 

1920 births
2008 deaths
United States Army Air Forces personnel of World War II
Florida lawyers
Florida state senators
Judges of the United States District Court for the Southern District of Florida
People from Monticello, Florida
Presbyterian College alumni
United States Air Force officers
United States Army Air Forces officers
United States district court judges appointed by Lyndon B. Johnson
20th-century American judges
Fredric G. Levin College of Law alumni
State attorneys